is a Japanese former actor and model from Seto, Aichi. He is best known for portraying Retsu Fukami/Geki Blue in the Super Sentai series Juken Sentai Gekiranger. He is the twin brother of actor Shinpei Takagi.

He and Shinpei quit acting in 2017 and is now a Freelance Photographer

Filmography

Television

References

External links
Official profile at Stardust Promotion 
Official blog

Living people
People from Seto, Aichi
Actors from Aichi Prefecture
Identical twin male actors
Stardust Promotion artists
Japanese male voice actors
Japanese male models
Japanese twins
Nagoya University alumni
1985 births